The 2019–20 Azerbaijan First Division  is the second-level of football in Azerbaijan. MOIK Baku were the defending champions.

Teams
On 8 August 2019, it was announced that Shuvalan wouldn't participate in this season.

Table

References

External links
 pfl.az
 AFFA 
 Azerbaijan First Division summary (SOCCERWAY)

Azerbaijan First Division seasons
Azerbaijan First Division
2